Almanzo James Wilder (February 13, 1857? – October 23, 1949) was the husband of Laura Ingalls Wilder and the father of Rose Wilder Lane, both noted authors.

Biography

Early life 
Almanzo James Wilder is said to have been born on February 13, 1857, at Wilder Homestead outside Malone, New York, as the fifth of six children born to farmers James Mason (1813–1899) and Angelina Albina (née Day) Wilder (1821–1905). His siblings included Laura Ann (1844–1899), Royal Gould (1847–1925), Eliza Jane (1850–1930), Alice Maria (1853–1892), and Perley Day Wilder (1869–1934).  As part of her Little House series of semi-autobiographical novels, Laura Ingalls Wilder wrote a book titled Farmer Boy about Wilder's childhood in upstate New York; he would subsequently become a recurring character in the later Little House books in which his wife wrote about their courtship and subsequent marriage, in The Long Winter, Little Town on the Prairie, These Happy Golden Years, and The First Four Years respectively. He also appears briefly in chapter 28 ('Moving Day') of By the Shores of Silver Lake. Almanzo is characterized as a quietly courageous, hardworking man who loves horses and farming, and is also described as an accomplished carpenter and woodworker. 

Farmer Boy recounts events of Wilder's childhood, starting when he was weeks shy of his ninth birthday in 1866.  Among other things, he begins attending school when not needed at home for farm work, learns to train and drive a team of oxen, attends a county fair, and enjoys a mid-19th century Fourth of July celebration in the town of Malone.  Almanzo also learns to deal with being bossed around by his older siblings, particularly his strong-willed sister Eliza Jane, who would later become a schoolteacher of his future wife.

Farmer Boy was the second book published in the Little House series.  Hitting bookstore shelves in 1933, it was followed by Little House on the Prairie in 1935.  The original order of publication was changed by publisher Harper with the subsequent release of the illustrated 1953 and 1971 editions.

Moving to The West 
The Wilder family left Burke in 1870 due to crop failures.  Moving west, they settled in Spring Valley, Minnesota, where they established a farm.  In 1879, Wilder, his older brother Royal, and older sister Eliza Jane moved to the Dakota Territory, taking claims near what would later become the town of De Smet, South Dakota.  Wilder settled on his homestead with the intent of planting acres of seed wheat which he had cultivated the previous summer on rented shares in Marshall, Minnesota. It was in De Smet that he first met Laura Ingalls. The Ingalls family had been one of the first settlers in the area, before the town was formally organized.  They moved to the Dakota Territory from Walnut Grove, Minnesota, when Charles Ingalls  took a temporary job with the railroad.

Ingalls wrote of Wilder's character in The Long Winter.  Along with his future wife's school chum, Ed "Cap" Garland, Wilder risked his life to save the citizens of De Smet from starvation during the long, hard winter of 1881.  Wilder was 23 and Garland 16 when, in between storms of a winter of almost nonstop horrific blizzards that shook the region during the 1880–1881 winter, they went  into the open prairie in search of wheat a farmer had reputedly harvested somewhere to the southwest of De Smet. The two men found the farmer and after a difficult negotiation, purchased 60 bushels of wheat.  Hauling the life-saving food on sleds that continually broke through the snow into slough grass, they just made it back to De Smet before another four-day blizzard hit the area.

Marriage to Laura Ingalls 
When Wilder was believed to be 25 years old and Ingalls was age 15, the two began courting.  Wilder would drive Ingalls  back and forth between De Smet and a new settlement  outside town where she was teaching school and boarding. Then, when spring arrived, the couple would go for long buggy rides.  Three years later, on August 25, 1885, Wilder and Ingalls were married in De Smet by the Reverend Edward Brown. They settled on Wilder's claim and began their own small farming operations. The Wilders' daughter, Rose, was born December 5, 1886. Rose Wilder later became known as the author Rose Wilder Lane, a noted political writer and philosopher.

During their first years of marriage, described in The First Four Years, the Wilders were plagued by bad weather, illness, and large debts. In the spring of 1888, Wilder and his wife were both stricken with diphtheria. Although they both survived, Wilder suffered from one of the less common, late complications of the illness, neuritis.  Areas of Wilder's legs were temporarily paralyzed, and after the paralysis had resolved, he needed a cane to walk. His inability to perform the hard physical labor associated with wheat farming in South Dakota, combined with a lengthy drought in the late 1880s and early 1890s, further contributed to the Wilders' downward spiral into insolvency..

The year 1889 proved the breaking point for the Wilders. In early August, Laura gave birth to a son.  The child remained unnamed when, two weeks later, he suddenly died of "convulsions." Laura Ingalls Wilder never spoke of his death, and the couple did not have another child. 

In the same month, the little family lost their home to a fire and their crops to drought. According to Rose Wilder Lane, "It took seven successive years of complete crop failure, with work, weather and sickness that wrecked his health permanently, and interest rates of 36 per cent on money borrowed to buy food, to dislodge us from that land."

In 1890, the Wilder family moved to Spring Valley, Minnesota, to stay with his parents on their farm. It was a time of rest and recovery for the weary family. Between 1891 and 1892, the family again moved, this time to Westville, Florida.  They hoped a warmer climate would help Wilder regain his strength.  Ultimately, while the warmer temperatures did help him recover, his wife did not like the humid climate or the customs of the backwoods locals.  

They returned to De Smet in 1892, and rented a small house in town. Between 1892 and 1894, the Wilders lived in De Smet, with the Ingalls family nearby. Laura Ingalls Wilder worked as a seamstress in a dressmaker's shop, while Wilder found work as a carpenter and day laborer. Together, they practiced frugality and carefully saved their money.

Settling in Missouri and later years 
On July 17, 1894, the Wilders left De Smet for the Ozarks of Missouri by covered wagon, attracted by brochures of "The Land of the Big Red Apple" and stories of a local man who had traveled to Missouri to see the area for himself. On August 31, they arrived near Mansfield, Missouri, and Wilder placed a $100 down payment on 40 acres (16.2 ha) of hilly, rocky undeveloped land that his wife aptly named "Rocky Ridge Farm." The farm would be the couple's final home. Over the span of 20 years, Wilder built his wife what she later referred to as her dream house: a unique 10-room home in which he custom-built kitchen cabinets to accommodate her small, five-foot (1.52 m) frame.

Rocky Ridge Farm was eventually expanded to about 200 acres (80.9 ha) and was a productive poultry, dairy, and fruit farm. Wilder's lifetime love of Morgan horses was indulged, and he also kept a large herd of cows and goats. Having learned a hard lesson by focusing on wheat farming in South Dakota, the Wilders chose a more diversified approach to farming suited to the climate of the Ozarks. Almanzo Wilder lived out the rest of his life on his farm, and both he and his wife were active in various community and church pursuits during their time in Missouri.

Although royalties from the Little House books helped provide for the Wilders, their daughter helped support them until the mid-1930s. Eventually their efforts at Rocky Ridge during the 1930s and 1940s, along with the book royalties finally provided a secure enough income to allow them to attain a financial stability they had not known earlier in their marriage. When they were first married, Wilder's wife had helped contribute to their income by taking in occasional boarders, writing columns for a rural newspaper, and serving as Treasurer/Loan Officer for a Farm Loan Association.  Their daughter lived with the Wilders on the farm for long periods of time, seeing that electricity and other modern updates were brought to the place, even having an English-style stone cottage built for them, and then taking over the farm house for about ten years.

Wilder learned to drive an automobile, which greatly improved their ability to leave the farm. The couple took several long auto trips, with destinations such as California and the Pacific Northwest, and went several times to visit the remaining Ingalls family in South Dakota. When their daughter moved permanently to Connecticut around 1937, the Wilders quickly returned to their beloved farm house, later selling off the eastern land with the stone cottage.

Wilder spent his last years happily tending small vegetable and flower gardens, indulging his lifetime love of woodworking and carpentry and tending his goats. He aided his wife in greeting the carloads of Little House fans who regularly found their way to Rocky Ridge Farm.

Wilder died on October 23, 1949, after suffering two heart attacks. Laura Ingalls Wilder died eight years later, on February 10, 1957. Their daughter, Rose Wilder Lane lived until 1968. All three are buried in Mansfield, and many of Wilder's possessions and handiwork can be seen today at Rocky Ridge Farm, as well as the Malone, New York, and Spring Valley, Minnesota, farm sites.  The Rocky Ridge Farm is known today as the Laura Ingalls Wilder/Rose Wilder Lane Museum.

From the accounts left by his wife and daughter, Almanzo Wilder appears to have been a quiet, stoic man, representative of the time and culture in which he lived. His love of farming, horses, and rural living are well documented within his family and friends' written recollections.

Family tree

Name origin 
In one of Laura Ingalls Wilder's books, Little Town on the Prairie, the attribution of her husband's  unusual first name reads thus:
It was wished on me. My folks have got a notion there always has to be an Almanzo in the family, because 'way back in the time of the Crusades there was a Wilder went to them, and an Arab or somebody saved his life. El Manzoor, the name was. They changed it after a while in England.

In the media

Books
Laura Ingalls Wilder published in 1933 the novel Farmer Boy, a mostly fictional account based on one year from Almanzo's childhood. Heather Williams wrote and published, in 2012, Farmer Boy Goes West, another (and even more) fictional book based on Almanzo's childhood.

Television
Wilder was portrayed in the television adaptations of Little House on the Prairie by :
 Dean Butler, in the television series Little House on the Prairie and its movie sequels,
 Walton Goggins, in Beyond the Prairie: The True Story of Laura Ingalls Wilder films.

Legacy
The boyhood home of Almanzo Wilder near Malone, New York, was listed on the National Register of Historic Places in 2014. Operated and sustained by the Almanzo & Laura Ingalls Wilder Association, the homestead is an interactive educational center, museum, and working farm.

References

External links 
Almanzo Wilder Farm — Almanzo's boyhood home
Information on Malone, New York — from the website "Laura Ingalls Wilder, Frontier Girl." 
Little House in Limbo: Article on Almanzo Wilder
Almanzo's claim documentation discussed
Minnesota Historical Society: Minnesota State Census Index 1875
About the Ingalls Family (Sarah S. Uthoff)

1857 births
1949 deaths
Farmers from New York (state)
People from Wright County, Missouri
People from Malone, New York
People from De Smet, South Dakota
Wilder family
People from Spring Valley, Minnesota
Year of birth uncertain